PI may refer to:

Arts and media
 Politically Incorrect (blog), a German political blog
 Seattle Post-Intelligencer or P-I, a newspaper in the United States
 Primitive Instinct, an English rock band formed in 1987
P.I. (TV series), 2017 Singaporean TV series

Businesses and organizations

Political parties 
  or Independent Party, a political party in Uruguay
  or Intransigent Party, an Argentine political party
 Partit per la Independència, a political party in Catalonia (Spain) of the 1990s

Other businesses and organizations
 Perimeter Institute for Theoretical Physics, a research centre in Ontario, Canada
 Privacy International, a UK-based charity that supports the right to privacy across the world
 Defunct Piedmont Airlines (1948–89) (IATA airline code PI)
 Philadelphia International, record label founded in 1971
 Profibus and Profinet International (PI), a large automation community

Science and technology

Biology and medicine 
 Parental investment, in evolutionary biology 
 Paternity Index, a value used to calculate probability of paternity
 Pistillata, a gene that influences the development of flowers in the ABC model of flower development
 Phosphatidylinositol, a class of lipids
 Ponderal index, a measure of leanness of a person (similar to body mass index)
 Propidium iodide, a chemical used as a DNA stain
 Primary immunodeficiency
 Protease inhibitor (pharmacology), class of drugs used to treat or prevent infection by viruses, including HIV and Hepatitis C
 Protease inhibitor (biology), molecules that inhibit the function of proteases
 Pulsatility index, a ratio of blood flow rates

Computing 
 Persistent identifier, a long-lasting reference to a digital object 
 Processing Instruction, an SGML and XML node type
 Programmed instruction, a technology invented to improve teaching
 Provider-independent address space, a type of internet (IP) address

Other uses in science and technology
 Isoelectric point (pI), the pH at which a particular molecule or surface carries no net electrical charge.
 Power integrity, in digital electronics
 PI controller, a concept in automation and control engineering
 Plasticity index, a measure of the plasticity of a soil
 Polyimide, a polymer of imide monomers
 , a cataloging system for libraries
 Principal investigator, the lead scientist or engineer for a particular project

Other uses 
 Pass interference, a foul in American and Canadian gridiron football
 People's Initiative, one of the modes in which the constitution of the Philippines could be amended
 Philippine Islands (P. I.), the commonly used name of the Philippines during the US colonial period
 Pirot, a city located in south-eastern Serbia (license plate code PI)
 Political incorrectness or politically incorrect, commonly abbreviated to PI or PIC
 Pro forma invoice, in business
 Private investigator (P.I.), a person who can be hired to undertake investigations
 Profitability index, the ratio of payoff to investment of a proposed project
 Personal injury

See also 

 Pi (disambiguation)
 P1 (disambiguation)
 PL (disambiguation)